Travis Elborough (born 1971, Worthing, Sussex, England) is the British author of The Bus We Loved: London's Affair With the AEC Routemaster (Granta Books, 2005); The Long-Player Goodbye: The Album From vinyl To iPod And Back Again (Sceptre 2008); and Wish You Were Here - England on Sea (Sceptre 2010) and A Walk in the Park (Jonathan Cape, 2016).

He reviews for The Guardian, and has contributed to New Statesman, The Sunday Times, Zembla and The Oldie.

References

Living people
British writers
1971 births